Jewerl Thomas is a former professional American football player who played running back for five seasons for the Los Angeles Rams, Kansas City Chiefs, and San Diego Chargers.

References

1957 births
American football running backs
Los Angeles Rams players
Kansas City Chiefs players
San Diego Chargers players
San Jose State Spartans football players
Living people